The Albacete Police Museum is a museum on the history of the city police in Albacete, Spain. It opened on 2 October 2006 in new rooms in the Jefatura de la Policía Local de Albacete.

Collections 
The earliest uniform in the collection dates to 1854, the date of the foundation of the city's Municipal Guard.

The Police Museum shows the history of the Albacete Local Police through its symbols, clothing, weapons and vehicles. The collection of uniforms dates from 1854, when the Municipal Guard was founded, to the present day. Among the vehicles, the collection of all the motorcycles used by the police throughout its history as well as the bicycles used in the 40s and 50s of the 20th century stand out. The museum showcases display antique weapons and other police items.

References 

Law enforcement museums in Europe
Museums in Castilla–La Mancha
Military and war museums in Spain
Museums established in 2006
Regional law enforcement agencies of Spain